Keshbridge is a small village in County Antrim, Northern Ireland. In the 2001 Census it had a population of 99 people. It is situated in the Lisburn City Council area.

The Kesh House was built in the 19th century. Coal stores and weighbridges populate the town along an old coal canal.

References 
NI Neighbourhood Information System
Draft Belfast Metropolitan Area Plan 2015

See also 
List of villages in Northern Ireland
List of towns in Northern Ireland

Villages in County Antrim